The International Nuclear Library Network (INLN), coordinated by the IAEA Library, i.e. the Library of the International Atomic Energy Agency, is a consortium of nuclear libraries and knowledge centres. The Network seeks to promote the exchange of nuclear information and to strengthen strategic partnerships amongst members. The underlying strategy is twofold: first, whenever a new partner joins the network, the shared information base is enlarged; and second, the larger the information base becomes, the more attractive the network is. The 37 nuclear libraries coming from 27 countries that participate in the coalition have managed to enhance their information pool and extend their services to cover nuclear information and knowledge needs on a global scale.

History 

The International Nuclear Library Network was founded in 2005 by the IAEA Library and the Atomic Energy of Canada Limited (AECL) Library. In its initial years, it counted a total of five members (in addition to the initiators, the National Atomic Energy Commission of Argentina, the Turkish Atomic Energy Agency and the Institute of Nuclear Physics of Uzbekistan Academy of Science. In 2006, the Australian Nuclear Science and Technology Organisation (ANSTO) also joined the network. In 2007, the INLN welcomed four new members: the China Nuclear Information Centre, the Nigerian Nuclear Regulatory Authority, the Obninsk State Technical University for Nuclear Power Engineering in the Russian Federation, and the Russian Association of Nuclear Science and Education (RANSE), thus increasing the membership to ten participants. In 2008, at the meeting of INLN Members and prospective members, during the 34th International Nuclear Information System (INIS) Liaison Officers Meeting in Vienna, a large number of nuclear libraries from around the world expressed their interest and subsequently joined the INLN: the Belarus INIS Center, Chair of Ecological Information Systems, the Nuclear Research Institute Rez plc of Czech Republic, the Egyptian Atomic Energy Authority (EAEA), the Ghana Atomic Energy Commission Library, the Bhabha Atomic Research Centre (BARC) of India, the Radiological Protection Institute of Ireland, the Japan Atomic Energy Agency (JAEA), the Instituto Nacional de Investigaciones Nucleares (ININ), Centro de Información y Documentación Nuclear (CIDN) of Mexico, the Centre National de l' Energie des Sciences et des Techniques Nucléaires (CNESTEN) of Morocco, the Korea Atomic Energy Research Institute (KAERI) at the University of Science and Technology (South Korea), the Vinca Nuclear Institute of Serbia,  the Centre National des Sciences et Technologies Nucléaires (CNSTN) of Tunisia. In November of the same year, the Library Network of the Brazilian Nuclear Energy Commission (Comissão Nacional de Energia Nuclear – CNEN), consisting of seven nuclear libraries, became an INLN official member. In January 2009, the Commissariat à l'Énergie Atomique (CEA) - Centre de Saclay - Centre de Ressources Documentaires joined the Network, while in 2010, the National Atomic Energy Commission, the Norwegian Radiation Protection Authority, and the Pakistan Institute of Nuclear Science & Technology decided to become INLN members. The Nuclear Energy Regulatory Agency of Indonesia - Badan Pengawas Tenaga Nuklir and the New Zealand Institute of Environmental Science and Research – National Radiation Laboratory are the newest members, raising the total number of Nuclear Libraries/Information Centres participating in the INLN to 37.

Structure and function 

The International Nuclear Library Network (INLN) represents a coalition of nuclear libraries. It is designed to be an Internet-based library and information system. Its information portal is hosted by the IAEA Library and it is supported by nuclear libraries and knowledge centres worldwide; it is developed and maintained in a decentralized manner, in accordance with agreed standards. It links not only bibliographic information to full-text and audio-visual information, but also librarians, library clients and researchers to the appropriate information. Moreover, the network links nuclear information workers to each other, forming a strong community of practice, sharing knowledge, best practices and lessons learned. Among the services that INLN members provide to each other are: research services, interlibrary loans, document delivery, current awareness services and any other services participating libraries wish to provide other libraries. The website offers a landing page hosting access to members' online catalogues. 
The success of INLN is based on its democratic structure: all participating libraries are equal partners, valued according to what they bring as practitioners in terms of information and their willingness to share, rather than on predetermined hierarchical or status levels. The actual work of the network focuses on concrete actions, bringing the right information in the right format at the right time to the right place.

Membership 

Membership in the INLN is open to States who are Members of the IAEA and to UN organizations. Other interested international, intergovernmental and non-governmental organizations may also join, subject to agreement of the INLN Members. Each INLN Member has the same rights and responsibilities.
To apply for INLN membership, an official request is to be made by the appropriate library to the IAEA Library, which is the coordinating library of the Network. If the requesting library is located in an IAEA Member State or belongs to an UN organization, the IAEA Library as the coordinating library will make modifications to the INLN website and inform the applicant and other participants about a new member. 
For other prospective participants, the coordinating library will seek approval from all existing member libraries/knowledge centres. The Coordinator, after receiving the approval from current members, will inform the applicant and the members of the outcome, and proceed with updating the INLN website.

Country members and institutions' external links

References

 Giannakopoulos, Thanos (2012). "INLN achievements in 2011." In IAEA: Nuclear Information & Knowledge 12:10. Online. Available: INIS & IAEA Library Newsletter
 Hahn-Weinert, Ruth (2009). "INLN: Facilitating Exchange and Building Partnerships." In IAEA: Nuclear Information & Knowledge 7:3. Online. Available: INIS & NKM Newsletter
 Hahn-Weinert, Ruth (2008). "The year in review: International Nuclear Library Network." In IAEA: Nuclear Information and Knowledge 5:12. Online. Available: INIS & NKM Newsletter
 Hahn-Weinert, Ruth (2007). "Doing More with Less: The International Nuclear Library Network." In IAEA: Nuclear Information and Knowledge 3:15. Online. Available: INIS & NKM Newsletter

Other external links 
International Nuclear Library Network (INLN) official website
IAEA Library official website
IAEA  official website

Austrian digital libraries
Nuclear technology